The Secretariat of the 17th Congress of the All-Union Communist Party (Bolsheviks) was in session from 1934 to 1939.

Secretariat

References

Secretariat of the Central Committee of the Communist Party of the Soviet Union members
Secretariat
Secretariat